The Baker Street Jewish Cemeteries are a group of 42 Jewish cemeteries in use since the 1920s on Baker Street in the West Roxbury section of Boston. The cemeteries are located on land that once formed part of Brook Farm, a 19th-century communal-living experiment.

The series of small cemeteries are strung along both sides of a narrow access road at 776 Baker Street that leads only to the last of the small cemeteries. Each was owned and managed by an individual Boston-area congregation or Jewish organization.

According to The Boston Globe, "the Baker Street cemeteries are home to some of the city's most striking, albeit endangered, examples of historic religious architecture. Dotting the road are 10 chapel buildings about the size of one-room schoolhouses, perfectly rendered synagogues in miniature, with glorious stained glass, vaulted ceilings, ornate chandeliers, oak pulpits, and other vestiges of the final destination for members of a once-thriving immigrant community."

Over the years, many of the small congregations that supported several sections of the cemeteries have dissolved as the leadership passed on and there were no young members to take their places. In the late 1980s, after several years of neglect, the Jewish Cemetery Association of Massachusetts (JCAM) was granted the rights to the abandoned cemeteries so that they could be restored and maintained, and have plots made available for new interments.

Notable burials
 Michael Hammer, engineer and professor of computer science
 Johnny Most, sports announcer
 Nahum M. Sarna, biblical scholar
 Joseph B. Soloveitchik, American Orthodox rabbi

Cemeteries of Baker Street Jewish Cemeteries 
The 42 cemeteries are:

 Abramson
 Agudath Israel
 American Friendship
 Anshe Sfard
 Atereth Israel
 Beth El
 Boylston Lodge
 Butrimantzy
 Chevra Shaas
 Crawford Street Memorial Park
 Custom Tailors
 David Vicur Cholim
 Hebrew Rehabilitation Center
 Hebrew Volin
 Imas-Roxbury Lodge
 Independent Pride of Boston
 Independent Workmen's Circle
 Kaminker
 Kehillath Jacob
 Kopaigorod
 Koretzer
 Kovner
 Lawrence Avenue
 Lord Rothschild
 Mohliver
 New Palestine
 Olita
 Ostro Marshoe
 Polonnoe
 Pulpit Rock
 Pultusker
 Puritan
 Quincy Hebrew
 Shara Tfilo
 Shepetovka
 Sons of Abraham
 Staro Konstatinov
 Stepiner
 Temple Emeth (two separated parcels)
 Vilno
 Temple Beth Zion on Zviller site
 Zviller

See also
 List of cemeteries in Boston, Massachusetts

References

 Cemetery Detail Map

External links
 Jewish Cemetery Association of Massachusetts

Jewish cemeteries in Massachusetts
Jews and Judaism in Boston
Cemeteries in West Roxbury, Boston